Vadim Ivanovich Utkin (30 October 1937 – 18 September 2022) was a Russian-American control theorist, electrical engineer and a professor of Electrical Engineering and Mechanical Engineering at the Ohio State University. He is best known for being one of the originators of Sliding Mode Control and Variable Structure Systems, which have become fundamental concepts in the field of nonlinear control (e.g. robust control).

Biography 
Utkin was born in Moscow, Russia. He was with the Institute of Control Sciences from 1960 to 1994, where he served as its Head of Discontinuous Control Systems Laboratory from 1973 to 1994. He joined the Ohio State University in 1994 as the Ford Chair of Electromechanical Systems, and was the first professor to hold this distinction  until 2002.

He was an IEEE Fellow, and he has been the recipient of awards such as the Lenin Prize and the Humboldt Prize. He also holds honorary doctorates from the University of Sarajevo and Rovira and Vergil University.

Selected works 
 Sliding Modes and their Applications in Variable Structure Systems. Mir, Moscow, 1978.
 Sliding Modes in Control and Optimization, Springer Verlag, 1992.
 Sliding Mode Control in Electro-Mechanical Systems, Taylor & Frencis. 1st edition 1999, 2nd edition 2009.

References 

1937 births
2022 deaths
Control theorists
Fellow Members of the IEEE
Ohio State University faculty
Russian emigrants to the United States
Scientists from Moscow